The men's 500 metres races of the 2015–16 ISU Speed Skating World Cup 4, arranged in the Thialf arena in Heerenveen, Netherlands, were held on 11 and 13 December 2015.

Pavel Kulizhnikov of Russia won race one, while his compatriot Aleksey Yesin came second, and Alex Boisvert-Lacroix of Canada came third. Espen Aarnes Hvammen of Norway won the first Division B race.

Ruslan Murashov of Russia won race two, with Boisvert-Lacroix in second place, and Hvammen in third. Denis Koval of Russia won the second Division B race.

Race 1
Race one took place on Friday, 11 December, with Division B scheduled in the afternoon session, at 14:00, and Division A scheduled in the evening session, at 17:22.

Division A

Division B

Race 2
Race two took place on Sunday, 13 December, with Division B scheduled in the morning session, at 12:15, and Division A scheduled in the afternoon session, at 16:27.

Division A

Division B

References

Men 0500
4